Cho Yong-tae (born 31 March 1986) is a South Korean football player who plays as a forward.

Club career

Cho first started playing football when he was nine years old. He turned down the chance to join his hometown club, Incheon United, choosing instead to sign for Suwon Bluewings in 2005, aged 19.

He spent three two years playing for Suwon's youth team before making the step-up to senior level in 2008, at the age of 21. Cho made 20 league appearances for Suwon across two seasons (2008 and 2009), scoring twice. In January 2010 he moved to Gwangju Sangmu for the two-year army service.

Career statistics
Correct as of 14 November 2011

External links
 

1986 births
Living people
People from Suncheon
South Korean footballers
Association football forwards
Gyeongnam FC players
Suwon Samsung Bluewings players
Gimcheon Sangmu FC players
Gwangju FC players
Seoul E-Land FC players
K League 1 players
K League 2 players
Yonsei University alumni
Sportspeople from South Jeolla Province